The Nimrod Hunt is a science fiction novel by Charles Sheffield. The story takes place hundreds of years in the future, with humanity having extensively colonized surrounding space, including beyond the Solar System. Humans have encountered three extraterrestrial races, which although all bizarrely different in physiology and psychology coexist peacefully. In order to defend from unknown threats beyond known space, a security company creates highly advanced robotic soldiers to patrol the border. These go haywire and become the single greatest threat. A series of four-member teams, with a representative from each species, is dispatched to deal with the problem. The action of the story follows one such team.

The novel was revised as The Mind Pool with a different ending. In the preface to The Mind Pool, the author describes how he was unhappy with the original.

1986 American novels
Novels by Charles Sheffield
1986 science fiction novels
American science fiction novels